The 1906 Cornell Big Red football team was an American football team that represented Cornell University during the 1906 college football season.  In their fifth, non-consecutive season under head coach Pop Warner, the Big Red compiled an 8–1–2 record, shut out 6 of 11 opponents, and outscored all opponents by a combined total of 237 to 37. Three Cornell players received honors on the 1906 College Football All-America Team: guard Elmer Thompson (Walter Camp-1, Caspar Whitney-2); center William Newman (Whitney-1); and fullback George Walders (Whitney-2).

Schedule

References

Cornell
Cornell Big Red football seasons
Cornell Big Red football